The Syndicat des Cols Bleus de la Ville de Laval is a trade union representing blue-collar workers in Laval, Quebec, Canada. It was established in 1965 and has been an affiliate of the Canadian Union of Public Employees since 2000.

External links
Syndicat des Cols Bleus de la Ville de Laval

References

Canadian Union of Public Employees
Laval, Quebec